Micke Grove Zoo is a small  zoo that opened in 1957 in Lodi, California. It is located within Micke Grove Regional Park, which includes a Japanese garden, the San Joaquin County Historical Society and Museum, an amusement park, and picnic shelters and Frisbee golf.

History

In 1938, the Micke family donated the  oak tree park to the county of San Joaquin. The zoo opened in 1957 and Ronald Theodore Reuther was its first curator.

Currently, it is home to native animals and exotic species, some of which are endangered, and was at one point the smallest zoo accredited by the Association of Zoos and Aquariums. However, the zoo lost its accreditation in April 2006 due to aging exhibits and cramped veterinarian space. While the veterinarian space has been expanded and the department supported by the University of California at Davis Veterinary Teaching Hospital, many exhibits are still in need of expansion.

Animals

Included in the current collection are a variety of non-releasable raptors, tortoises, and a variety of lemurs,. Many endangered primates and birds can also be found at the zoo, including parrots and tortoises from Madagascar. As of 2014, a snow leopard has been added. Expansion originally planned in 2010 was to include Oriental small-clawed otters and an expanded snow leopard habitat, however construction was halted midway and it has been postponed until additional funding can be found.

Micke Grove Zoo participates an international Species Survival Plan (SSP Program) to help ensure the survival of wildlife that are endangered or critically endangered in the wild. Micke Grove Zoo has made significant contributions to the SSP Program through captive breeding of Golden Lion Tamarin, Chilean Pudu, and Waldrapp Ibis.

Education

Educational programs are funded with support of the Micke Grove Zoological Society. Important school based programs include six weeks of private zoo camp offered for San Joaquin County students, five weeks of public zoo camp; Animal Discovery Tours, and off-site Zoo Mobile programs. Their most popular programs and events include Zoo After Dark, Zoo Tots, Toys for Critters, and HalloWILD.

References

External links

Amusement parks in California
Parks in San Joaquin County, California
Tourist attractions in San Joaquin County, California
1957 establishments in California
Lodi, California
Zoos in California
Zoos established in 1957
Amusement parks opened in 1957